

Otto von Schrader (18 March 1888 – 19 July 1945) was a German admiral during World War II and a recipient of the Knight's Cross of the Iron Cross of Nazi Germany. Schrader was taken prisoner of war in Norway at the end of World War II. He committed suicide in Norwegian captivity on 19 July 1945.

Awards 
 Iron Cross (1914) 1st Class (1 August 1916)
 Knight's Cross of the House Order of Hohenzollern with Swords (5 March 1922)
 Hanseatic Cross of Hamburg (5 March 1922)
 U-boat War Badge (20 November 1926)
 Gallipoli Star (Ottoman War Medal - ) (20 November 1926)
 Knight's Cross with Crown of the Bulgarian Order of Military Merit (20 November 1926)
 Clasp to the Iron Cross (1939) 1st Class (5 May 1940)
 German Cross in Gold on 20 November 1941 as Vizeadmiral and Admiral of the Norwegian West Coast
 Knight's Cross of the Iron Cross on 19 August 1943 as Admiral as commanding admiral of the Norwegian West Coast

References

Citations

Bibliography

 Michael Böcker: "Admiral Otto von Schrader (1888-1945). Marineoffizier in der Zeit der Weltkriege." Dissertation in Form einer Biografie, Wuppertal April 2015, 352.S 
 Dörr, Manfred (1996) (in German). Die Ritterkreuzträger der Überwasserstreitkräfte der Kriegsmarine—Band 2:L–Z. Osnabrück, Germany: Biblio Verlag. .
 
 .

1888 births
1945 suicides
People from Ełk
People from East Prussia
U-boat commanders (Imperial German Navy)
Reichsmarine personnel
Imperial German Navy personnel of World War I
Admirals of the Kriegsmarine
Recipients of the Knight's Cross of the Iron Cross
Recipients of the Silver Imtiyaz Medal
Recipients of the Silver Liakat Medal
Knights of the Order of Military Merit (Bulgaria)
Recipients of the Gold German Cross
World War II prisoners of war held by Norway
Prisoners who died in Norwegian detention
German military personnel who committed suicide
Suicides in Norway
People who committed suicide in prison custody
Recipients of the clasp to the Iron Cross, 1st class